Inge Jell was a German figure skater. She won the 1947 German national senior title and two junior national titles. She was an international ice skating champion in her class at St. Moritz and twice won the medal of the King of Sweden. She placed tenth at the 1951 European Championships in Zurich, Switzerland. She performed in U.S. ice shows for two years and featured in various German shows.

She belonged to Münchner EV in Munich and SC Riessersee in Garmisch-Partenkirchen.

Results

References 

German female single skaters
Year of birth missing (living people)
Living people
20th-century German women